Diamond was a merchant ship built on Isle of Man in 1824. She made a number of voyages between England and India with cargo and undertook one voyage transporting convicts to New South Wales.

Career
Under the command of James Bissett and surgeon William McDowell, she sailed from Cork, Ireland on 29 November 1837 and arrived at Sydney on 28 March 1838. She embarked 161 female convicts and had one death en route. A number of women, children and one male passenger accompanied the voyage. 

Diamond departed Port Jackson on 8 November 1820, bound for Java. 

She is last listed in Lloyd's Register of Shipping in 1853.

Citations and references
Citations

References

1835 ships
Ships built in the Isle of Man
Convict ships to New South Wales
Age of Sail merchant ships
Merchant ships of the United Kingdom